The following is a list of squads for each nation competing in men's football at the 2004 Summer Olympics in Athens. Each nation must submit a squad of 18 players, 15 of whom must be born on or after 1 January 1981, and three of whom can be older dispensation players.

Group A

Greece

The following is the Greek squad in the men's football tournament of the 2004 Summer Olympics.

Head coach: Stratos Apostolakis

* Over-aged player.

Mali

The following is the Malian squad in the men's football tournament of the 2004 Summer Olympics.

Head coach: Cheick Oumar Kone

* Over-aged player.

Mexico

The following is the Mexican squad in the men's football tournament of the 2004 Summer Olympics.

Head coach:  Ricardo La Volpe

* Over-aged player.

South Korea

The following is the South Korean squad in the men's football tournament of the 2004 Summer Olympics.

Head coach: Kim Ho-kon

* Over-aged player.

Group B

Ghana

The following is the Ghanaian squad in the men's football tournament of the 2004 Summer Olympics.

Head coach:  Mariano Barreto

* Over-aged player.

Italy

The following is the Italian squad in the men's football tournament of the 2004 Summer Olympics.

Head coach: Claudio Gentile

* Over-aged player.

Japan

The following is the Japanese squad in the men's football tournament of the 2004 Summer Olympics.

Head coach: Masakuni Yamamoto

* Over-aged player.

Paraguay

The following is the Paraguayan squad in the men's football tournament of the 2004 Summer Olympics.

Head coach: Carlos Jara Saguier

* Over-aged player.

Group C

Argentina

The following is the Argentine squad in the men's football tournament of the 2004 Summer Olympics.

Head coach: Marcelo Bielsa

* Over-aged player.
Notes

Australia

The following is the Australian squad in the men's football tournament of the 2004 Summer Olympics.

Head coach: Frank Farina

* Over-aged player.

Serbia and Montenegro

The following is the Serbia and Montenegrin squad in the men's football tournament of the 2004 Summer Olympics.

Head coach: Vladimir Petrović

* Over-aged player.

Tunisia

The following is the Tunisian squad in the men's football tournament of the 2004 Summer Olympics.

Head coach: Khemais Labidi

* Over-aged player.

Group D

Costa Rica

The following is the Costa Rican squad in the men's football tournament of the 2004 Summer Olympics.

Head coach: Rodrigo Kenton

* Over-aged player.

Iraq

The following is the Iraqi squad in the men's football tournament of the 2004 Summer Olympics.

Head coach: Adnan Hamad

* Over-aged player.

Morocco

The following is the Moroccan squad in the men's football tournament of the 2004 Summer Olympics.

Head coach: Mustapha Madih

* Over-aged player.

Portugal

The following is the Portuguese squad in the men's football tournament of the 2004 Summer Olympics.

Head coach: José Romão

* Over-aged player.

References

External links
FIFA Olympics Coverage

Men's team squads
2004 Summer Olympics Men's